is a former Japanese football player and manager he is the current head coach J2 League team Zweigen Kanazawa .

Club career
Yanagishita was born in Hamamatsu on January 1, 1960. He played as a central defender for his local club Yamaha Motors during their 1980s glory years, making a total 135 League appearances for the club. He retired in 1992.

National team career
In 1979, Yanagishita selected Japan U-20 national team for 1979 World Youth Championship in Japan. At this competition, he played 3 games.

Coaching career
After the retirement, Yanagishita started coaching career at Yamaha Motors (later Júbilo Iwata) in 1993. He mainly served as assistant coach until 2002. In 2003, he became a manager. Júbilo won the 2nd place in J1 League and the champions in Emperor's Cup with many international players. In 2004, he moved to J2 League club Consadole Sapporo. Consadole finished at bottom place in 2004 and could not be promoted to J1 in 2005 and 2006. He resigned end of 2006 season. In 2007, he returned to Júbilo and served as assistant coach. In 2009, he became a manager again. Although the club results were bad in J1 League, the club won the champions in 2010 J.League Cup. He resigned end of 2011 season. In June 2012, he signed with Albirex Niigata which was at the 17th place of 18 clubs. The club finished at the 15th place and remaining in J1 League. He managed until end of 2015 season. In 2017, he signed with J2 League club Zweigen Kanazawa.

Managerial statistics
Update; December 31, 2018

References

External links 

Profile at Albirex Niigata 

1960 births
Living people
Tokyo University of Agriculture alumni
Association football people from Shizuoka Prefecture
Japanese footballers
Japan youth international footballers
Japan Soccer League players
Júbilo Iwata players
Japanese football managers
J1 League managers
J2 League managers
Júbilo Iwata managers
Hokkaido Consadole Sapporo managers
Albirex Niigata managers
Zweigen Kanazawa managers
Association football defenders